Gérard Pirès (born 31 August 1942) is a French film director and writer.

Filmography

 Guo bao zong dong yuan (Adventures in the NPM) (2007)
 Les Chevaliers du ciel (Sky Fighters) (2005)
 Double zéro (2004)
 Steal (2002) 
 Taxi (1998)
 De Serge Gainsbourg à Gainsbarre de 1958 - 1991 (1994) (V) (segment "Monsieur William" 1968)
 Rends-moi la clé! (1981)
 L'Entourloupe (The Swindle) (1980)
 L'Ordinateur des pompes funèbres (The Probability Factor aka. The Undertaker Parlor Computer) (1976)
 Attention les yeux! (Let's Make a Dirty Movie) (1976)
  (Act of Aggression) (1975)
 Elle court, elle court la banlieue (The Suburbs Are Everywhere) (1973)
  (Fantasia Among the Squares) (1971)
 L'Art de la turlute (1969)
 Fête des mères, La (1969) (short)
 S.W.B. (1969) (short)
 Erotissimo (1968)
 Je ne sais pas (1966) (short)

External links 
 

French film directors
1942 births
Living people
French-language film directors